The Ortoiroid people were the second wave of human settlers of the Caribbean who began their migration into the Antilles around 2000 BCE. They were preceded by the Casimiroid peoples (~4190-2165 BCE). They are believed to have originated in the Orinoco valley in South America, migrating to the Antilles from Trinidad and Tobago to Puerto Rico. The name "Ortoiroid" comes from Ortoire, a shell midden site in southeast Trinidad, they have also been called Banwaroid after another archaeological site in Trinidad

Settlement patterns
The Ortoiroid are believed to have developed in South America before moving to the West Indies. The earliest radiocarbon date for the Ortoiroid is 5230 BCE from Trinidad.

The two earliest Ortoiroid sites in Trinidad are the Banwari Trace and at St. John's Road, South Oropouche, which date back at least to 5500 BCE. At this time, Trinidad might have still been connected to the South American mainland.

The majority of archaeological sites associated with the Ortoiroid are found near or on the coasts. Tobago has at least one Ortoiroid site, Martinique has two, and Antigua has 24 Ortoiroid shell-midden sites. Ortoiroid peoples settled on St. Kitts from 2000 BCE to 400 BCE.

In the north, two distinct Ortoiroid subcultures have been identified: the Coroso culture, which flourished from 1500 BCE–200 CE, and the Krum Bay culture, which spanned 1500—200 BCE. The Coroso people lived in Puerto Rico, where the oldest known site is the Angostura site, dating from 4000 BCE. The Krum Bay people lived in the Virgin Islands. Krum Bay culture, which emerged between 800 BCE and 225 BCE, also extended to St. Thomas.

The Ortoiroid are considered the first settlers of the archipelago of Puerto Rico; however, recent reexamination of data, artifacts, and agricultural evidence and assumptions about culture have suggested a more complex picture.

Lifeways and material culture
The Ortoiroid were hunter-gatherers. Shellfish remains have been found at Ortoitoid sites indicating that they constituted an important part of the diet. This diet also included turtles, crabs, and fish.

They were known for their lithic technology but did not have ceramics. Ortoiroid artifacts include bone spearpoints, perforated animal teeth worn as jewelry, and stone tools, such as manos and metates, net sinkers, pestles, choppers, hammerstones, and pebbles used for grinding.

Ortoiroid people lived in caves and the open. They buried their dead in the soil beneath shell middens. Red ochre was found at some sites and may have been used for body paint.

Decline
The Ortoiroid were displaced by the Saladoid people in the West Indies. In many regions, they disappeared by approximately 400 BCE; however, the Coroso culture survived until 200 CE.

See also
History of the Caribbean
History of Puerto Rico
Indigenous peoples of the Americas

Notes

References
Rodríguez Ramos, Reniel. Rethinking Puerto Rican Precolonial History. Tuscaloosa: University of Alabama Press, 2010. .
Rouse, Irving. The Tainos: Rise and Decline of the People who greeted Columbus. New Haven, CT: Yale University Press, 1992. .
 Saunders, Nicholas J. The Peoples of the Caribbean: an Encyclopedia of Archeology and Traditional Culture. ABC-CLIO, 2005. .

Further reading
 Ferguson, James: Far From Paradise. Latin American Bureau, 1990. .
 Kurlansky, Mark. 1992. A Continent of Islands: Searching for the Caribbean Destiny. Addison-Wesley Publishing.
 Rogozinsky, Jan: A Brief History of the Caribbean. Plume, 1999. .

Indigenous peoples of the Caribbean
Pre-Columbian cultures
Archaeology of the Caribbean
Archaic period in the Americas
Cultural history of Puerto Rico
Social history of Puerto Rico
History of Trinidad and Tobago